Charles Crawford (27 December 1866 – 28 December 1945) was a United States Army officer and an author. He served in the Spanish–American War, the Philippines and World War I.

Early life and education 
Crawford was born in Coshocton, Ohio to Thomas Crawford and Margaret Parkhill. In 1889, Crawford graduated from the United States Military Academy, where he was a classmate of future army general Charles Dudley Rhodes. Later, he graduated from the Army War College in 1912.

Military career 
Crawford served as a second lieutenant in the 10th Infantry on the United States frontier between 1889–1895, which included military police duty in Oklahoma City until 1890 and assisting the U.S. Commission in dealings with American Indian tribes; between 1891–1892 he organized an Apache Indian Company in the 10th Infantry. During the Spanish–American War he participated in the Battle of San Juan Hill (1898) and was later commended for his bravery. Between 1903–1907 he taught at Fort Leavenworth, Kansas in the Infantry and Cavalry School and the Army Staff College. Crawford also served in the Philippines a number of times, first during 1890–1902 and again between 1909–1911. From 1913–1916 Crawford served on the General Staff of the U.S. Army, after which he was in Panama Canal Zone until 1917. During World War I, Crawford served with the American Expeditionary Force as a brigadier general of the National Army. There he commanded the 6th Infantry Brigade, 3rd Infantry Division during the Second Battle of the Marne. In 1919, Crawford retired due to disabilities.

Personal life and death 
Crawford lived in Paola, Kansas and died on 28 Dec. 1945 in an automobile accident.  He was buried in Paola, Kansas.

He was a Presbyterian and married to E.M. Miller (d. 1919), they had no children. Crawford was also an author of two books, Six Months with the Sixth Brigade and Restarting Economic Theory.

References

External links 
 Six Months with the Sixth Brigade at archive.org

United States Army generals of World War I
American military personnel of the Spanish–American War
1866 births
1945 deaths
20th-century American writers
American non-fiction writers
United States Army War College alumni
United States Military Academy alumni
People from Coshocton, Ohio
Military personnel from Ohio
United States Army generals
Burials in Kansas